Jalal in Iran may refer to:
 Jalal, Kermanshah
 Jalal, South Khorasan